Paul Higgins may refer to:

 Paul Higgins (ice hockey) (born 1962), Canadian ice hockey right winger
 Paul Higgins (footballer) (1946–2016), Australian rules footballer
 Paul Higgins, alias of the perpetrator of the 1973 Canadian Imperial Bank of Commerce bank robbery
 Paul Higgins (actor) (born 1964), Scottish film and television actor
 R. Paul Higgins, physician and higher education officer from New York state
 Paul O'Higgins (1927–2008), Irish scholar of human rights and labour law